The Scout and Guide movement in Trinidad and Tobago is served by
 The Girl Guides Association of Trinidad and Tobago, member of the World Association of Girl Guides and Girl Scouts
 The Scout Association of Trinidad and Tobago, member of the World Organization of the Scout Movement

International Scout units in Trinidad and Tobago
In addition, there are American Boy Scouts in Port of Spain, linked to the Direct Service branch of the Boy Scouts of America, which supports units around the world.

See also